Divisive may refer to:

 divisive clustering, which is a type of hierarchical clustering
 divisive rhythm
 Divide and rule
 Divisive, a 2022 studio album by Disturbed